Armadale may refer to:

Places

Australia
Armadale, Victoria, a suburb of Melbourne
Armadale, Western Australia, a suburb of Perth
City of Armadale, a local government area
Electoral district of Armadale, a Legislative Assembly electorate

Rail in Australia
Armadale/Thornlie railway line, Western Australia
Armadale railway station, Western Australia
Armadale railway station, Victoria

Canada
Armadale, Ontario, a historic community

School in Canada
Armadale Public School, an elementary school

Scotland
Armadale, Skye, Highland
Armadale, Sutherland, Highland
Armadale, West Lothian
Armadale Stadium

Other usage
Armadale (automobile), an obsolete British automobile
Armadale (novel), a book by Wilkie Collins
Armadale F.C., an association football club based in Armadale, West Lothian
Armadale SC, an association football club based in Armadale, Western Australia

See also

Armadale railway station (disambiguation)
Armdale, Halifax, Nova Scotia, Canada
Armidale (disambiguation)